Yu Kuo-hwa (January 10, 1914 – October 4, 2000) was the Premier of the Republic of China from 1984 to 1989.

Biography
He was born on 10 January 1914 in Fenghua, Ningbo, Zhejiang, China. He studied for degrees at Harvard University and the London School of Economics.

He was appointed as Minister of Finance on 29 November 1967 and became Governor of the Central Bank of China in 1969.

As Premier, Yu was responsible for ending Taiwan's 38 years of martial law in 1987. In October 1988, he walked out of a meeting of the Legislative Yuan, the first time a government official had done so, as extensive debate made it impossible for Yu to deliver his reports. He died from complications from leukemia at 4pm on 4 October 2000 at the Veterans' General Hospital in Taipei.

Yu was preceded by Sun Yun-suan and succeeded by Lee Huan.

See also
 List of premiers of the Republic of China

References

1914 births
2000 deaths
Harvard University alumni
Politicians from Ningbo
Premiers of the Republic of China on Taiwan
Taiwanese Ministers of Finance
Republic of China politicians from Zhejiang
Recipients of the Order of Brilliant Star
Alumni of the London School of Economics
Taiwanese people from Zhejiang
Governors of the Central Bank of the Republic of China